Peter Campbell FREng, FIStructE, FICE, FIMarE, FIHT, FIDE, MASCE (born January 1932 in Coulsdon, Surrey-died 1 May 2021) was a British structural engineer.

Early life and education 
Campbell grew up in Coulsdon, Surrey and went to Purley High School for Boys. He attended the Brixton School of Building (now London South Bank University) from 1948-51. In 1951 he passed the graduate examination of the Institution of Structural Engineers and immediately joined Arup. After two years military service he studied for a DIC in concrete technology at Imperial College London

Career 
Campbell and Ian Reith  formed Campbell Reith and Partners in 1960. Projects which he personally supervised were a new Government Centre in Mauritius, the IBRD 1st education project in Trinidad and Tobago, Slough Estates HQ, the West Stand at the Oval, the Japanese Embassy in London and the HQ for Southern Water in Worthing. From 1962-68 Campbell taught the theory of structures at Regent Street Polytechnic London. He invented a flexible cladding device and in 1981 established a museum of concrete at the Chalk Pitts Museum at Amberley in West Sussex. Peter retired from Campbell Reith as a senior partner in 1992. He was Chairman of the Association of Consulting Engineers 1991-92  and was President of the Institution of Structural Engineers in 1998-09.

Awards and honours 
Freeman of the City of London  and Liveryman of the Worshipful Company of Paviors
Justice of the Peace in the Surrey Division of Reigate

Selected publications 
Learning from Construction Failures

References 

British structural engineers
Fellows of the Institution of Civil Engineers

Alumni of London South Bank University
20th-century British engineers

Presidents of the Institution of Structural Engineers
Fellows of the Royal Academy of Engineering
21st-century British engineers